Pas Kamar is a village in Pol Khatun Rural District, Marzdaran District, Sarakhs County, Razavi Khorasan Province, Iran. At the time of the 2006 census, its population was 1,121, with 223 families.

References 

Populated places in Sarakhs County